Connor Stanley may refer to:
 Connor Stanley (footballer), English footballer
 Connor Stanley (EastEnders), an EastEnders character